A New Kind of Family is an American sitcom that aired on ABC from September 1979 to January 1980. The series stars Eileen Brennan, Rob Lowe and Telma Hopkins. It is not to be confused with, nor is it related to, the series Family, which aired concurrently on ABC.

Synopsis
Eileen Brennan stars as Kit Flanagan, a widowed mother of three who shares a home with a divorced woman, Abby Stone (Gwynne Gilford), and her daughter Jill in an effort to save money.

Halfway during the series' first season, it was pulled from the schedule and re-tooled in an effort to boost ratings. The characters of Abby and Jill Stone were written out and new characters, Jess and Jojo Ashton (played by Telma Hopkins and Janet Jackson respectively), were added to the series. Despite the cast change, the show was cancelled in January 1980.

Cast
 Eileen Brennan as Kit Flanagan
 Rob Lowe as Tony Flanagan
 Lauri Hendler as Hillary Flanagan
 David Hollander as Andy Flanagan
 Gwynne Gilford as Abby Stone (September–October 1979)
 Connie Ann Hearn as Jill Stone (September–October 1979)
 Telma Hopkins as Jess Ashton (December 1979 – January 1980)
 Janet Jackson as Jojo Ashton (December 1979 – January 1980)
 Chuck McCann as Harold Zimmerman

Episodes

Award nominations

References

External links
  
 

1979 American television series debuts
1980 American television series endings
1970s American sitcoms
1980s American sitcoms
American Broadcasting Company original programming
English-language television shows
Television series about families
Television shows set in Los Angeles